Mike Cottingham was a contributor to the Irish Folklore Commission.

Cottingham was a native of Raheen, Caherlistrane, and was a notable contributor during the early years of the Irish Folklore Commission. The local pronunciation of his surname was Cotnum. An ancestor of Cottingham had arrived in the area  during the 17th century , sent by one of the Stuart kings concerned about the dwindling timber supply from Ireland. Some of Cottingham's work was later published in local journals and local history books.

References
The History and Folklore of the Barony of Clare, Michael J. Hughes, c. 1993.

Irish folklorists
20th-century Irish people
People from County Galway